The Museum of Broken Relationships is a museum in Zagreb, Croatia, dedicated to failed love relationships. Its exhibits include personal objects left over from former lovers, accompanied by brief descriptions.

The "museum" began as a traveling collection of donated items. Since then, it has found a permanent location in Zagreb. It received the Kenneth Hudson Award for Europe's most innovative museum in 2011.

In 2017, the museum saw more than 100,000 visitors, making it the 11th most visited museum in Croatia.

History
The museum was founded by two Zagreb-based artists, Olinka Vištica, a film producer, and Dražen Grubišić, a sculptor. After their four-year love relationship came to an end in 2003, the two joked about setting up a museum to house the left-over personal items. Three years later, Grubišić contacted Vištica with this idea, this time in earnest. They started asking their friends to donate objects left behind from their break-ups, and the collection was born. It was shown to the public for the first time in 2006, in Glyptotheque Zagreb, as a part of the 41st Zagreb Salon.

In the years that followed, the collection went on a world tour, visiting Argentina, Bosnia and Herzegovina, Germany, Macedonia, the Philippines, Serbia, Singapore, Slovenia, South Africa, Turkey, the United Kingdom, and the United States. Between 2006 and 2010, the collection was seen by more than 200,000 visitors. Along the way, it gathered new items donated by members of the public; more than 30 objects were donated by Berliners alone during the exhibition in that city in 2007.

In the meantime, after unsuccessful attempts to interest the Croatian Ministry of Culture in finding a temporary location for the museum, Vištica and Grubišić decided to make a private investment and rent a  space in Zagreb's Upper Town, making it the city's first privately owned museum. The museum, finally opened in October 2010, proved popular with foreign tourists in particular, not only due to its original subject matter, but also the fact that it is open seven days a week, unlike other museums in the city.

In May 2011, the Museum of Broken Relationships received the Kenneth Hudson Award, given out by the European Museum Forum (EMF). The award goes to "a museum, person, project or group of people who have demonstrated the most unusual, daring and, perhaps, controversial achievement that challenges common perceptions of the role of museums in society", rating the "importance of public quality and innovation as fundamental elements of a successful museum". The EMF's judging panel noted:

The Museum of Broken Relationships encourages discussion and reflection not only on the fragility of human relationships but also on the political, social, and cultural circumstances surrounding the stories being told. The museum respects the audience's capacity for understanding wider historical, social issues inherent to different cultures and identities and provides a catharsis for donors on a more personal level.

Concept
The Museum of Broken Relationships is described by its founders as an "art concept which proceeds from the (scientific) assumption that objects (in the broadest sense, i.e., matter as a whole) possess integrated fields—‘holograms’ of memories and emotions—and intends with its layout to create a space of ‘secure memory’ or ‘protected remembrance’ in order to preserve the material and nonmaterial heritage of broken relationships".

The project is divided into several segments:
 Material remains layout includes the objects and documents like photographs, letters, or messages. Items are presented with dates and locations of the relationship, and annotations by their anonymous donors. Due to physical space constraints, older exhibits may be archived and transferred to the virtual part of the museum.
 Virtual web museum enables the registered visitors to become donors through uploading their images and documents. Donors can decide whether to open their personal collections for viewing by other users of the museum.
 Confessional is the interactive part of the museum in which visitors can store their objects or messages, or record their confessions in a restricted and intimate space.

Travelling exhibitions 
Until now, the Museum of Broken Relationships has been on tour in the following cities:

 Split, Croatia (2006)
 Ljubljana, Slovenia (2006)
 Maribor, Slovenia (2007)
 Sarajevo, Bosnia and Hercegovina (2007)
 Skopje, North Macedonia (2007)
 Berlin, Germany (2010)
 Pula, Croatia (2008)
 Belgrade, Serbia (2008)
 Rijeka, Croatia (2008)
 Nitra, Slovakia (2008)
 San Francisco, USA (2009)
 Singapore (2009)
 Kilkenny, Ireland (2009)
 Manila, Philippines (2009)
 Cape Town, South Africa (2009)
 Istanbul, Turkey (2010)
 Bloomington, USA (2010)
 St. Louis, USA (2010)
 Buenos Aires, Argentina (2011)
 Houston, USA (2011)
 London, United Kingdom (2011)
 Sleaford, Lincolnshire, United Kingdom (2012)
 Paris, France (2012/2013)
 Boulder, USA (2013)
 Taipei, Taiwan (2013)
 Amsterdam, Netherlandss (2014)
 Mexico City, Mexico (2014)
 London, United Kingdom (2014)
 Taipei, Taiwan (2014)
 Brussels, Belgium (2014)
 San Francisco, USA (2015)
 Basel, Switzerland (2015)
 Mons, Belgium (2015)
 Whitehorse, Canada (2015)
 Boise, USA (2016)
 Helsinki, Finland (2016)
 Jeju, South Korea (2016)
 Cologne, Germany (2016)
 Copenhagen, Denmark (2017)
 Heidelberg, Germany (2017)
 Istanbul, Turkey (2017)
 New York, USA (2017)
 Tokyo, Japan (2018)
 Priština, Kosovo (2018)
 Shanghai, China (2018)
 Alta, Norway (2018)
 Skopje, North Macedonia (2019)
 Tbilisi, Georgia (2019)
 Toronto, Canada (2019)
 Melbourne, Australia (2019)
 Dunedin, New Zealand (2020)
 York, United Kingdom (2020)
 Bucharest, Romania (2020)
 Aveiro, Portugal (2021)

Museum of Broken Relationships in L.A.
Since 2016 the Museum of Broken Relationships can be found in two cities; the original one is located at the Upper Town in Zagreb, Croatia, while the newly founded one was located in Los Angeles, USA.

During his stay in Zagreb, famous American lawyer John B. Quinn visited the Museum of Broken Relationships, and he liked it so much that he decided to start a cooperation with the founders of the museum. The Museum of Broken Relationships in Los Angeles opened its doors to the public on June 4, 2016, and was located in the heart of Hollywood, with Alexis Hyde as the director. The size of the venue is around a thousand square meters, and most of the items included in the museum come from the collection initiated in Los Angeles, while a smaller portion of the items were from the Zagreb collection. The Los Angeles location is closed as of November 2017 while looking for a new location.

See also
 Museum of Failure, inspired by the Museum of Broken Relationships

References

Further reading

External links

 
 
 

Museum of Broken Relationships
Museum of Broken Relationships
Museums established in 2010
Museums in Zagreb
Museum of Broken Relationships